Rosedale is a station on Line 1 Yonge–University of the Toronto subway. It is located on the east side of Yonge Street at Crescent Road.

This reflects the fact that no high volume surface bus routes connect to the station and the affluent Rosedale neighbourhood has a lower population density and lacks major destinations.

There is only one entrance to the station, the entrance acts as the concourse, and the subway platforms are directly below. Wi-Fi service is available at this station.

, construction had started to install two elevators to make Rosedale station accessible. The elevators will connect the street-level concourse to each of the north- and southbound platforms. Completion is expected in 2024.

Architecture 

This open-air station has separate canopies over the two platforms. Two pedestrian bridges allow access to the northbound platform on the east side, one from the main entrance off Crescent Road and the other from the bus platforms on the west side of the station

The station, designed by John B. Parkin in 1947 and opened in 1954, was designated as a heritage property, under PART IV of the Ontario Heritage Act by City of Toronto By-law 440-90, passed August 13, 1990.

Despite the station's historic designation the original large green-blue Vitrolite panels and black trim on the platform walls were replaced by small square dark green tiles in a unique criss-cross pattern with yellow lettering and no trim.

Subway infrastructure in the vicinity 

After leaving Bloor station northbound, the Yonge–University line crosses under Church Street in a tunnel and emerges to the surface at the Ellis Portal, running in a cutting through Rosedale station. Originally the line continued north in open cut all the way to the Price Portal, where the tunnel resumed, but a one-block section from Rowanwood Drive to Price was roofed over in 2002 for parking.

Budd Sugarman Park

The southwesterly portion of the property, which is surplus to the needs of the TTC for use as part of the subway or bus station, has been developed as a public park. The park is named in honour of the civic activist Budd Sugarman, who died in 2004. In 2008 the City of Toronto, Parks, Forestry and Recreation Division proposed an expansion of the park along Yonge Street and a reconfiguration of the bus loop. This was rejected by the TTC on the grounds that it would negatively affect passengers and bus operations, while providing no transit benefits, and eliminate any potential long term development of the site, which is contrary to a stated policy of encouraging development at subway stations.

Nearby landmarks 
Nearby landmarks include Ramsden Park and the Studio Building.

Surface connections 

TTC routes with a connection to the station include:

References

External links 

Line 1 Yonge–University stations
Railway stations in Canada opened in 1954